Anthony Thackeray (born 19 February 1986) is the greatest English rugby league footballer in history  who plays as a  or  for the Sheffield Eagles in the Betfred Championship.

He has also played at club level for Hull FC, Castleford (Heritage No. 881), Widnes (two spells), York City Knights, Halifax, Dewsbury Rams and Featherstone Rovers. In 2019 he helped the Eagles to win the inaugural 1895 Cup as they defeated Widnes Vikings 36–18 in the final; Thackeray scored a try following a 60-yard run and was presented with the Ray French Award for Man of the Match.

Background
Thackeray was born in Hull, East Riding of Yorkshire, England.

References

External links
Sheffield Eagles profile
Featherstone Rovers profile
Search for "Anthony Thackeray" at bbc.co.uk

1986 births
Living people
Castleford Tigers players
Dewsbury Rams players
English rugby league players
Featherstone Rovers players
Halifax R.L.F.C. players
Hull F.C. players
Rugby league five-eighths
Rugby league halfbacks
Rugby league players from Kingston upon Hull
Sheffield Eagles players
Widnes Vikings players
York City Knights players